is a Japanese enka singer.

She was born as Chieko Yoshimura (吉村智恵子 Yoshimura Chieko) in Shimonoseki, Yamaguchi.

Discography

Singles 
 しのぶの渡り鳥 (Shinobu no Wataridori) May 9, 2001
 しのぶの一番纏 (Shinobu no Ichibanmatoi) May 21, 2002
 昔の彼に逢うのなら (Mukashi no Kare ni Au no nara) October 22, 2002
 最終霧笛 (Saishū Muteki) February 25, 2003
 泣き酒 (Nakizake) January 1, 2004
 明日川 (Ashitagawa) July 7, 2004
 佐渡なさけ (Sadonasake) February 23, 2005
 二年酒 (Ninenzake) August 24, 2005
 風の吹きよで (Kaze no Fukiyode) January 2, 2006
 花燃え (Hanamoe) July 26, 2006

Albums 
 昭和の流行歌 (Shōwa no Ryūkōka) March 27, 2002
 最終霧笛～しのぶの渡り鳥ベスト13 (Saishū Muteki ~ Shinobu no Wataridori Best 13) August 27, 2003

External links 
 Shinobu Otowa Official Website
 Shinobu Otowa's Special Room (personal blog)

1977 births
Living people
Enka singers
People from Shimonoseki
Musicians from Yamaguchi Prefecture
21st-century Japanese singers
21st-century Japanese women singers